This article is about music-related events in 1872.

Events

May 29 – Franz Liszt's oratorio 'Christus (Liszt)' (composed 1862-"66) premiered in the Protestant church at Weimar.
June 5 – closure of the Teatro Re following its final performance, Rossini's The Barber of Seville
June 24 – Karl Müller-Hartung founds an "Orchesterschule" ("Orchestra School") at Weimar.
Friedrich Nietzsche takes up musical composition again after a long break.
Tomás Bretón and Ruperto Chapí receive the first prize of the Madrid Conservatory.
Anton Rubinstein begins a tour of the United States at the behest of Steinway and Sons.
Richard Wagner completes the full draft of Götterdämmerung.

Published popular music 
 "The Gospel Train" by Fisk Jubilee Singers
 "Moonlight on the Potomac" by John Philip Sousa
 "Waste Not, Want Not [You Never Miss the Water Till the Well Runs Dry]" by Harry Linn & Rollin Howard
 "Only a Dream" by George Cooper & William Vincent Wallace
"Under the silvery stars," words by Arthur W. French, music by William A. Huntley

Classical music 
Georges Bizet – L'Arlésienne Suite No. 1 from the incidental music to Alphonse Daudet's play of the same name
Anton Bruckner – Symphony No. 3
Joseph Callaerts – Grande fantaisie de concert, Op.5
Antonín Dvořák – Piano Quintet No. 1
César Franck – Veni creator
Charles Gounod - Funeral March of a Marionette
Franz Paul Lachner -Octet for winds, Op. 156
Franz Liszt - Sunt lacrymae rerum
Modest Mussorgsky – The Nursery
Camille Saint-Saëns - Cello Concerto No. 1
Johan Svendsen – Carnival in Paris, Op.9
Pyotr Ilyich Tchaikovsky - Symphony No. 2 
Charles-Marie Widor – Organ Symphony No.4, Op.13 No.4 
August Winding - Three Fantasy Pieces, for clarinet or violin and piano, Op. 19

Opera 
Georges Bizet – Djamileh
Gialdino Gialdini –  premiered at the Teatro Goldoni, Florence
Alexandre Charles Lecocq – Les cent vierges
Miguel Marqués – 
Karel Miry
 (opera in 4 acts, libretto by Hendrik Conscience, premiered on December 2 in Brussels)
 (opera in 1 act, libretto by P. Geiregat, premiered in Brussels)
Modest Mussorgsky – Boris Gudonov, Revised Version
Jacques Offenbach – Fantasio
Camille Saint-Saëns – La princesse jaune, Op. 30

Musical theater 
 La fille de Madame Angot, Brussels production
 La Vie parisienne, London production

Publications 
Richard Wagner – Über die Benennung "Musikdrama"

Births 
January 1 – Hermine Finck, opera singer (d. 1932)
January 6 – Alexander Scriabin, Russian composer (d. 1915)
January 11 – Paul Graener, conductor and composer (d. 1944)
January 16 – Henri Büsser, conductor and composer (d. 1973)
January 23 – Adelina de Lara, pianist and composer (d. 1961)
March 6 – Ben Harney, ragtime pianist and songwriter (d. 1938)
March 7 – Vasily Andreyevich Zolotaryov, Russian composer
March 8 – Paul Juon, Russian-Swiss violinist and composer (d. 1940)
March 10 – Felix Borowski, composer and music teacher (d. 1956)
March 19 – Sergei Diaghilev, choreographer (d. 1929)
March 20 – Bernhard Sekles, composer and music teacher (d. 1934)
March 30 – Sergey Nikiforovich Vasilenko, composer (d. 1956)
April 1 – Tadeusz Joteyko, composer
April 29 – Eyvind Alnæs, composer (d. 1932)
May 1 – Hugo Alfvén, composer (d. 1960)
June 22 – Clara Mathilda Faisst, pianist (died 1948)
July 7 – Juan Lamonte de Grignon, pianist, conductor and composer (d. 1949)
 July 8 – Harry Von Tilzer, songwriter (d. 1946)
July 18 – Julius Fučík, composer (d. 1916)
July 20 – Déodat de Séverac, composer (d. 1921)
 August 10 – Bill Johnson, dixieland jazz double-bassist (d. 1972)
August 15
Harold Fraser-Simson, composer and songwriter (d. 1944)
Rubin Goldmark, composer (d. 1936)
September 9 – Josef Stránský, conductor (died 1936)
 October 12 – Ralph Vaughan Williams, composer (d. 1958)
November 29 – Anna von Mildenburg, Austrian soprano (d. 1947)
December 17 – Walter Loving, military bandleader (k. 1945)
December 20 – Lorenzo Perosi, Italian composer (d. 1956)

Deaths 
January 20 – Raffaele Sacco, lyricist (b. 1787)
February 16 – Henry Fothergill Chorley, music critic (b. 1808)
March 22 – Karolina Bock, singer, dancer and actress (b. 1792)
March 23? - Hugo Ulrich, composer, teacher and arranger (b. 1827) (poss. born May 23)
April 3 – Henriette Widerberg, operatic soprano (b. 1796)
April 12 – Nikolaos Mantzaros, composer (b. 1795)
May 5 – Johann Kulik, luthier (b. 1800)
May 9 – Viktorin Hallmayer, conductor and composer (b. 1831)
May 15 – Thomas Hastings, composer of hymns (b. 1784)
July 26 – Michele Carafa, opera composer (b. 1787)
August 4 – Wilhelm Friedrich Wieprecht, conductor and composer (b. 1802)
August 11 – Lowell Mason, organist and composer (b. 1792)
September 16 – Gall Morel, choirmaster (b. 1803)
November 21 
Myllarguten, folk musician (b. 1801)
Emile Steinkühler, composer (born 1824)
November 29 – Giovanni Tadolini, composer

References 

 
19th century in music
Music by year